The 1940 Glasgow Pollok by-election was held on 30 April 1940 in the Glasgow Pollok constituency of the Parliament of the United Kingdom. The election was caused by the death of the previous MP, Sir John Gilmour.

As with other by-elections in the war period, the incumbent party was given a clear run by the other major parties.

It was won by Thomas Galbraith of the Unionist Party (Scotland).  His only opponent came from a local Labour party -
which had been disaffiliated by the party's National Executive Committee for breaking the electoral truce - and stood as an Independent Labour candidate.

References 

1940 elections in the United Kingdom
1940 in Scotland
1940s elections in Scotland
1940s in Glasgow
April 1940 events
By-elections to the Parliament of the United Kingdom in Glasgow constituencies